Thomas Secchi (born 19 June 1997) is a French professional footballer who plays as a goalkeeper for Rodez.

Career
Secchi joined the youth academy of Rodez in 2013, and is their long-term backup and reserve goalkeeper. He made his first appearance with the club in a Championnat National 2 match in 2016. He made his professional debut with Rodez 5 years later in a 1–0 Ligue 2 loss to Grenoble on 15 May 2021.

References

External links
 
 Rodez Profile

1997 births
Living people
People from Rodez
French footballers
Association football goalkeepers
LB Châteauroux players
Rodez AF players
Ligue 2 players
Championnat National players
Championnat National 2 players
Championnat National 3 players
Sportspeople from Aveyron
Footballers from Occitania (administrative region)